Alex Harz is a filmmaker, actor, improvisational theater performer, high-altitude mountaineer, adventurer, entrepreneur, radio personality and philanthropist. He is known for writing, producing, directing and or acting in such films as Imagine That, American Dream?, Lamb TV, Sink, etc. and has been featured in various television commercials, print and web advertising, music videos, comedy theater, and radio show productions.

Background 
Alex was born in Málaga, Spain and spent much of his early childhood years in Germany before his parents moved to the United States. He attended Lewis & Clark Junior High and Central High School in Omaha, Nebraska. After spending his first year in college at the University of Nebraska Omaha, he transferred to the University of Colorado Boulder where he received a bachelor's degree with an emphasis in international business & organizational communications. Upon graduating from the University of Colorado, Alex worked in the fields of international import / export merchandising, sports marketing, events management, and corporate IT before professionally pursuing his passion for filmmaking and acting.

Career 
Upon reuniting with his childhood friend from Nebraska, Tom Kennedy, Alex and Tom started making sketch comedy films in Boulder, Colorado while attending university. This led to the creation and release of the short film compilation series titled Lamb TV in 2006. After both graduated from college, Alex and Tom formed the production company Pure Film and released their first feature American Dream ? in 2005, a dark comedy which revolves around the life of a college graduate and his mentally-challenged friend attempting to find purpose and companionship during rough economic times in America. American Dream ? screened at the Forest Grove International Film Festival, The Director's View Film Festival in New York City, as well as other festivals throughout the United States. 

In 2007, Alex and Pure Film went on to co-produce the documentary The Veteran Story, which chronicles the lives of US Veterans who served in WWII, the Vietnam War and the Korean War. This documentary was developed, produced and released as a philanthropy film project, with all proceeds going to the veterans of the Louisiana War Veterans Home in Jackson, Louisiana.

Alex began his high-altitude mountaineering endeavors in 2007 and has successfully summitted some of the world's most coveted peaks, including Mount Rainier, Cerro Aconcagua, Denali aka Mount McKinley, etc. Combining his passion for filmmaking, philanthropy and high-altitude mountaineering, Alex announced his next comprehensive mountaineering project, an adventure-based media production to the Seven Summits of the world titled Live to the Top.

In 2011, Alex began his improvisational theater career at the Bovine Metropolis Theater in Denver, Colorado. He has performed regularly at the Bovine Theater and Voodoo Comedy Playhouse for such house teams as 'Oh! Chem!', 'Scoundrel', etc. and plays at various other theater venues throughout the year. 

In 2013, Alex was cast for the role of Patrick in the web comedy series One Die Short, an episodic series revolving around the world of role playing games.

In January 2014, the psychological thriller Sink, in which Alex played the lead role, was released to the public.

On 28 April 2014, Alex began his radio career at the Denver-based station 'KZKO The Vibe', with a weekly 1 hour improvised comedy show he spearheaded named the World Improv Network (WIN Show). On 4 October 2015 the WIN Show made its move and debut on Mile High Sports Radio (KDCO Denver – FM104.7 / AM1340), where it can be heard live every Sunday from 7:58 – 9pm MT on-air and online in 145+ countries around the world, and viewed live via videostreaming on Facebook Live, Periscope, YouTube, etc. @ World Improv Network. Based on the show's audience (aka WINners) suggestions & questions given via social media posts, calls into the 'AUDI Studio Line', etc., the WIN Show Cast then acts out in real-time whatever the WINners put them up to for any of the four WIN Show Segments (1. 'WIN World Local News' / 2. 'Community Court' / 3. 'Talking Points w Shabazz Davis' / 4. 'Good, Bad, Ugly & Horoscope Corner'). In August 2014, the WIN Show began podcasting in its entirety on ITunes, Google Play, etc. @ World Improv Network, while the individual show segments are available for playback at the WIN Show AudioBoom Page or World Improv Network YouTube Channel. 

In the fall of 2014, Alex was cast in several commercial shoots and PSAs for Mazda and the US Army. On 21 November 2014, Alex appeared as a contestant on ABC in the nationally syndicated game show, Let's Ask America, hosted by Bill Bellamy.

During the winter and spring of 2015, Alex performed in a series of music video shoots, including for the New Jersey-based alternative rock duo Brick + Mortar. In 2016, Alex was cast for a national anti-methamphétamine PSA advertising campaign, as well as becoming an Athlete Brand Ambassador for Honey Stinger, a honey-based energy and health food products company headquartered in Steamboat Springs, Colorado. 

2021-22 brought two of Alex's past endeavors together, high-altitude mountaineering and documentary filmmaking, for his newest media production titled 'THE QUEST' Series. The first release of the series, the critically acclaimed 'THE QUEST: Nepal' documentary (72 minutes), chronicles an iconic climb of Mount Everest while taking the audience through a cinematic journey into the rarely seen stories, fascinating culture and amazing landscapes of Nepal. 

On May 21st, Alex successfully summited Mount Everest as part of THE QUEST production.

In Summer 2022, Alex was officially inducted into The Explorers Club, one of the most prestigious science and exploration organizations in the world.  Founded in 1904, The Explorers Club has made many human firsts, including 1st to the North Pole in 1909 - Robert Peary and Matthew Henson; 1st to the South Pole in 1911 - Roald Amundsen; 1st to the summit of Mt. Everest in 1953 - Tenzing Norgay and Sir Edmund Hillary; 1st to the deepest point on earth in 1960 - Don Walsh and Jacques Piccard; 1st to land on the Moon in 1969 - Neil Armstrong and Buzz Aldrin; etc. Many other distinguished individuals have become members of The Explorers Club, including US President Theodore Roosevelt, film director James Cameron, space pioneers Elon Musk and Jeff Bezos, primatologist Jane Goodall, aviation pioneers Charles Lindbergh and Amelia Earhart, writer Lowell Thomas, etc.

Filmography 
As writer, director, producer, actor and or editor
 American Dream ? (2005)
 Lamb TV (2006)
 The Veteran Story (2007)
 Suburban (2008)
 Ink (2009)
 Imagine That (2009)
 Night Things (2010)
 Sink (2013)
 One Die Short (2014)
 WIN Show (2014 - 2017)
 THE QUEST: Nepal (2022)
 THE QUEST: Everest VR (2023)

References

External links 
 
 Official Website
 Alex Harz on Twitter

Living people
American mountain climbers
American philanthropists
Year of birth missing (living people)
University of Nebraska Omaha alumni
University of Colorado Boulder alumni
People from Omaha, Nebraska